Kim Kwang-hyok ( is a North Korean general and a politician.

Biography
In May 2016, after being listed in the Korean People's Army, he was appointed as a candidate member of the 7th Central Committee at the 7th Congress. On October 7, 2017, at the 2nd Plenary Session of the 7th Central Committee he became a full (voting) member. In December 2016, Choi Young-ho was appointed as the commander of the Korean People's Army Air and Anti-Air Force, Serving in this position until 2021 when he was replaced by Kim Chong-il. On the 14th of April 2022 he was appointed to General rank by the order of the Central Military Commission. At the time of Kim Yong-chun's death in August 2018, he served as a member of the funeral committee.

References

21st-century North Korean people
North Korean generals
Korean People's Army Air and Anti-Air Force
Workers' Party of Korea politicians
Members of the 7th Central Committee of the Workers' Party of Korea